Semyon Efimovich Desnitsky (c. 1740 in Nezhin, Russian Empire – June 26, 1789 in Moscow, Russian Empire) was a Russian legal scholar. He was known as a disciple of Adam Smith and introduced his ideas to the Russian public. He was also the first academic to deliver his lectures in Russian language rather than in Latin.

Biography 
Desnitsky  was born in Nezhin, Russian Empire (present-day Ukraine). He was the second son of a meschanin, a member of the petty bourgeoisie. After a brief spell in the Trinity Lavra seminary, he attended  Moscow University, starting in 1759. He went to continue his education at the University of Glasgow, where he studied with Adam Smith. In 1767, upon receiving  a doctor of laws degree (LLD), he returned to Russia and was appointed professor of law at Moscow University.

Desnitsky was the first Russian professor to question the authority of Samuel von Pufendorf on legal matters and the first to introduce the doctrines of Adam Smith and David Hume to Russian students. He also translated the works of Sir William Blackstone (Commentaries of the laws of England) and advocated equality of the sexes in family law.

Desnitsky pioneered the comparative approach to the study of law and regarded property as a cornerstone of every legal system. There was a great outcry over his rejection of Latin as the sole language of instruction; but Catherine II of Russia personally settled the issue in his favour.

Notes

References
Brown A.H., "The Father of Russian Jurisprudence:  The Legal Thought of S.E. Desnitskii", in William E. Butler (1977), Russian Law:  Historical and Political Perspectives, Berlin: Springer, pp. 117–41.

External links 

 Semyon Efimovich Desnitsky via The University of Glasgow Story

See also

List of Russian legal historians

1740 births
1789 deaths
People from Nizhyn
Lawyers from Moscow
Russian philosophers
Legal writers
Alumni of the University of Glasgow
Members of the Russian Academy
Professorships at the Imperial Moscow University
Imperial Moscow University alumni